Blechman is a surname. Notable people with the surname include:

Dean Blechman, American businessman, movie producer, and entrepreneur
Jonah Blechman (born 1975), American actor
Nicholas Blechman, American illustrator and graphic designer
R. O. Blechman (born 1930), American illustrator and author